Rasmea Yousef Odeh in Arabic رسمية يوسف عودة (born 1947/1948; also known as Rasmea Yousef, Rasmieh Steve, and Rasmieh Joseph Steve) is a Palestinian Jordanian and former American citizen who was a member of the Popular Front for the Liberation of Palestine convicted by Israeli military courts for involvement in the 1969 Jerusalem supermarket bombing. Odeh claimed that the confessions she claimed were obtained under torture, and that the charges were political. She was sentenced to life in prison in Israel and spent 10 years in prison before she was released in a prisoner exchange with the PFLP in 1980. After her release in a prisoner exchange, she immigrated to the United States, became a U.S. citizen, and served as associate director at the Arab American Action Network in Chicago, Illinois.

On November 10, 2014, Odeh was convicted of immigration fraud by a jury in federal court in Detroit, Michigan, for concealing her arrest and conviction by military court in Israel. On December 11, 2014, she was released on bond pending sentencing. Odeh's counsel maintains she did not receive a "full and fair trial" because the judge ruled as irrelevant her testimony that her confession to the crimes had been extracted by torture while she was in the custody of Israeli Police in 1969.

On February 13, 2015, federal Judge Gershwin A. Drain denied Odeh's request that he either overturn the federal jury’s conviction of her or grant her a new trial. He ruled that her argument lacked legal merit, as evidence showed that Odeh illegally obtained U.S. citizenship, the jurors "clearly did not believe [her] explanation", and that "the evidence was more than sufficient to support the jury’s verdict." Odeh was sentenced to 18 months in federal prison on March 12, 2015, stripped of her US citizenship, and set for deportation to Jordan after serving her time. She was free on bail while she appealed. Her conviction was vacated by the 6th Circuit Court of Appeals and sent back to the District Court in February 2016. In April 2017 she pleaded guilty to failing to disclose her previous conviction on her citizenship application. As part of the plea agreement she was deported without serving jail time.

Conviction and imprisonment by Israel
Originally from Lifta, Odeh was arrested in March 1969, and in 1970 was convicted and sentenced by an Israeli military court to life in prison for her involvement in two terrorist bombings in Jerusalem and involvement in an illegal organization, the Popular Front for the Liberation of Palestine (PFLP). Odeh alleged that her trial and imprisonment were a case of political detention, and claimed to have suffered torture and rape. The allegations were publicized as early as 1975 as her case was documented by lawyer Felicia Langer in Israel. Allegations that prison authorities tortured Odeh were also aired in 1979 by the Sunday Times special investigation team and came out in a special booklet. She alleges that, while undergoing torture, her father was brought into the room, she was stripped and he was asked to have intercourse with her, at which he fainted. It was this, she claims, that led her to make the confession used as state's evidence in her trial.

Although Odeh's legal representation disputes the veracity of her confession to these crimes, based on her allegation that it was obtained after torture by the Israeli military, according to American federal prosecutors the Israeli investigators had found "extensive bomb-making materials and explosives" and "explosive bricks in her room". According to Lis Harris, the trial was a sham, since she was not permitted to speak of torture, and an expert's testimony was disallowed. The Chicago Tribune reports that in the documentary, Women in Struggle, which was made before her indictment for concealing her arrest, Odeh made no denial that she had a role in the bombings. The video also includes an interview with Aisha Odeh, who was also charged in the case, in which she describes the role Rasmea Odeh played in the bombing; federal prosecutors stated that this version of events corresponds "precisely" with Rasmea Odeh's statement to Israeli authorities on her involvement. It was also pointed out that an observer from the International Committee of the Red Cross had attended her entire trial and stated that in his opinion, it had been a fair trial.

Odeh's primary claim of torture was that her father, Yousef Odeh, who was arrested at the same time as her, was allegedly forced to attempt to rape her on the day of their arrest. Nine days after their arrest, an American consular official visited Yousef Odeh, who is a naturalized U.S. citizen, while he was in custody to check on his condition. After their meeting, the official reported back to Washington that Yousef Odeh complained of "uncomfortable, overcrowded" conditions, but was otherwise receiving "no worse than standard treatment." Yousef Odeh did not report any claims of the mistreatment and torture that Rasmea Odeh would later allege.

One of the bombings killed 21-year-old Leon Kanner of Netanya and 22-year-old Eddie Joffe of a Tel Aviv suburb, on February 21, 1969. The two were killed by a bomb that was placed in a crowded Jerusalem SuperSol supermarket which the two students stopped in at to buy groceries for a field trip. The same bomb wounded nine others. A second bomb found at the supermarket was defused. Odeh was also convicted of bombing and damaging the British Consulate four days later.  Israeli authorities said the bombings were the work of the PFLP, which claimed credit for the bombings.

In 1980, Odeh was among 78 prisoners released by Israel in an exchange with the PFLP for one Israeli soldier captured in Lebanon. Odeh's lawyer stated she testified at the United Nations about being tortured. In a 1980 interview she confessed to participating in two bombings with PFLP, though says the intent was not to hurt anyone.

Entry into US; application for citizenship
In 1995, Odeh entered the United States from Jordan. At the time, according to her later federal indictment, she stated she had no criminal record. The U.S. Attorney in the Eastern District of Michigan said: "An individual convicted of a terrorist bombing would not be admitted to the United States if that information was known at the time of arrival." In 2004, Odeh applied to become a United States citizen. According to her indictment, on her immigration forms, she again answered "no" as to whether she had received any criminal convictions or served any time in prison; her defense attorneys claimed that she understood the form to be referring to her time in the United States.

Jennifer Williams, the Detroit immigration officer who interviewed Odeh in 2004, testified that she makes a point of clarifying to applicants that the question applies to convictions "anywhere in the world." Odeh would later testify that Williams had not done so in her case. Odeh was sworn in as a naturalized US citizen under the name "Rasmieh Joseph Steve" on December 9, 2004. She initially lived in Jackson, Michigan.

She appeared in the 2004 documentary Women in Struggle by Buthina Canaan Khoury, about four Palestinian women imprisoned in Israeli jails, which her opponents say provide evidence of her involvement in the bombings, as her co-conspirator Aisha Odeh freely implicated Rasmea Odeh in the bombing. She became associate director of the Arab American Action Network in Chicago.

Conviction for immigration fraud in the US
Odeh was indicted on October 17, 2013, for concealing her arrest, conviction, and imprisonment in her application, and for lying as to where she had lived previously. She was arrested five days later at her home in Evergreen Park, Illinois, in the Chicago area.

In May 2014, Odeh rejected a pre-trial offer from federal prosecutors that would have limited any prison sentence to a maximum of six months and, after that, allowed her to remain free (for a maximum of six months) until her deportation. She said she felt it was not in her best interest, and preferred the case to go to trial.

In August 2014, the first judge assigned to the case, federal district court Judge Paul Borman, recused himself after he learned that his family was part owners in the supermarket that had been bombed in 1969. He stated that his financial ties "could be perceived as establishing a reasonably objective inference of a lack of impartiality in the context of the issues presented in this case." Odeh's lawyers had earlier requested that he step down because he had received an award from the Jewish Federation of Metropolitan Detroit for supporting Israel, that his family had fundraised for a pro-Israeli charity, and that he had made many trips to Israel. He said that Odeh's lawyers were engaged in "careless and rank speculation" for suggesting that he could not be impartial in the case, stating that "a judge’s prior activities relating to his religious convictions are not a valid basis for questioning his impartiality in a particular case". He noted that some of the material brought forward applied to his cousin rather than himself.

Odeh was tried in November 2014 for immigration fraud before a federal jury in Detroit, Michigan, with Judge Gershwin A. Drain presiding. She was accused of concealing her 1969–70 arrest, conviction, and imprisonment when she filed US immigration papers. Odeh was also accused of lying in her immigration papers about her prior residency, falsely claiming that she had lived only in Jordan from 1948 until her application.

Before trial, her defense argued that Odeh had been tortured while in prison, and suffered from posttraumatic stress disorder. Judge Drain ruled that evidence on these matters were irrelevant to whether Odeh lied on her immigration documents, and disallowed testimony on these topics.

Odeh was convicted of immigration fraud in federal court in Detroit on November 10, 2014, for concealing her prior arrest, conviction, and imprisonment. The jury deliberated for two hours before rendering its verdict. Judge Drain told the jury: "I think your verdict is a fair and reasonable one based on the evidence that came in."

She had her bail revoked and was taken into custody upon the conclusion of her trial, as the judge found her to be a flight risk, and was incarcerated in Port Huron, Michigan. On December 8, Judge Drain agreed to allow her to be released on a $50,000 cash bond, pending sentencing, which was effected on December 11, 2014. On February 13, 2015, Judge Drain denied Odeh's request that he either overturn the federal jury's conviction of her or grant her a new trial, ruling that her argument lacked legal merit.  The judge held that evidence showed that Odeh illegally obtained U.S. citizenship, the jurors "clearly did not believe [her] explanation", and "the evidence was more than sufficient to support the jury’s verdict." Odeh was sentenced to 18 months in federal prison by Judge Drain on March 12, 2015, and it was announced that she would be stripped of her US citizenship and be deported from the United States to Jordan at the conclusion of her sentence. She was allowed to go free on bail during her appeal.

On February 25, 2016 the United States Court of Appeals for the Sixth Circuit unanimously vacated her conviction of an immigration violation, sending the case back to Judge Drain to reconsider the admissibility of expert testimony. Circuit Judge John M. Rogers, joined partially by Judge Karen Nelson Moore, vacated and remanded, while Judge Alice M. Batchelder partially dissented, wanting to vacate while ordering a new trial.  On December 6, 2016, Judge Drain in Detroit denied prosecutors’ request to reinstate Odeh’s conviction, instead granting Odeh a new trial, scheduled to begin January 10, 2017.

On March 23, 2017, Rasmea Odeh accepted a plea agreement where she would serve no prison time but would lose her U.S. citizenship and be deported.

On August 17, 2017, Odeh was formally stripped of her US citizenship in a federal court hearing in Detroit before Judge Gershwin Drain. She was subsequently ordered to be deported to Jordan and to pay a $1,000 fine for immigration fraud.

On September 20, 2017, Odeh was deported to Jordan.

On March 19, 2019, she was banned from speaking at a public meeting marking International Women’s Day in Berlin after German officials revoked her Schengen visa. Berlin city officials forced the Dersim Cultural Community Center to cancel the talk. According to Haaretz, Strategic Affairs Minister Gilad Erdan issued a statement saying the decision was made thanks to pressure applied by him and "a slew of Jewish organizations in Germany, as well as protest by the Israeli ambassador in Germany."

References

1940s births
20th-century criminals
20th-century Palestinian women
American prisoners and detainees
Date of birth missing (living people)
Living people
Illegal immigration to the United States
Jordanian people of Palestinian descent
Palestinian emigrants to the United States
Palestinian human rights activists
Palestinian people convicted of murder
People convicted of immigration fraud
People convicted on terrorism charges
People deported from the United States
People from Evergreen Park, Illinois
People from Jackson, Michigan
People imprisoned on charges of terrorism
Former United States citizens
Popular Front for the Liberation of Palestine
Prisoners and detainees of the United States federal government
Terrorism in Israel
Torture victims
Palestinian people imprisoned by Israel